Shirak SC Basketball is the professional basketball section of Shirak SC, a football club based in Gyumri, Armenia. Founded in 2017, it currently plays in the Armenia Basketball League A.

History
Shirak created the basketball section on 19 September 2017, thus becoming one of the seven founder clubs of the new Armenia Basketball League A. The team finished in the fifth position after their debut season.

In September 2018, Shirak resigned to continue playing in the League A and joined the League B.

Season by season

Administration and technical staff

References

External links
Shirak SC website
Eurobasket.com FC Shirak BC Page

2017 establishments in Armenia
Basketball teams established in 2017
Basketball teams in Armenia
Shirak SC